The 2014 Challenger La Manche was a professional tennis tournament played on indoor hard courts. It was the 21st edition of the tournament which was part of the 2014 ATP Challenger Tour. It took place in Cherbourg, France between February 24 and March 2, 2014.

Singles main-draw entrants

Seeds

 Rankings are as of February 17, 2014.

Other entrants
The following players received wildcards into the singles main draw:
  Lucas Pouille
  Axel Michon
  Albano Olivetti

The following players received special exempt into the singles main draw:
  Nikoloz Basilashvili

The following players used Protected Rankings to gain entry into the singles main draw:
  Simone Bolelli
  Gilles Müller

The following players received entry from the qualifying draw:
  Florent Serra
  Laurynas Grigelis
  Taro Daniel
  Jules Marie

Champions

Singles

 Kenny de Schepper def.  Norbert Gomboš, 3–6, 6–2, 6–3

Doubles

 Henri Kontinen /  Konstantin Kravchuk def.  Pierre-Hugues Herbert /  Albano Olivetti, 6–4, 6–7(3–7), [10–7]

External links
Official Website

Challenger La Manche
Challenger La Manche
2014 in French tennis
February 2014 sports events in France
March 2014 sports events in France